The Football Act 1424 was passed by the Parliament of Scotland in the reign of James I. It became law on 26 May 1424, one of a set of statutes passed that day; it is recorded as James I. 1424 (May 26) c.18 in the Record Edition of the statutes, and James I. Parl. 1-1424 c.17 in the Duodecimo Edition. The title of the Act was "Of playing at the fut ball".

The Act stated that it is statut and the king forbiddis that na man play at the fut ball under the payne of iiij d – in other words, playing football was forbidden by the King, and punishable by a fine of four pence.

The Act remained in force for several centuries, although somewhat unsurprisingly, it fell into disuse. It was finally repealed by the Statute Law Revision (Scotland) Act 1906.

Three further 15th century Acts (in 1457, 1470 and 1490) explicitly prohibit both football and golf (see Golf in Scotland) during wappenschaws for archery practice.

See also 
 Ba game
 Medieval football
 Football in Scotland
 Scotland in the Late Middle Ages
 Sport in Scotland

References

Sources 

 Gordon Donaldson, Scottish Historical Documents. Scottish Academic Press, 1970. Reprinted 1974.
 Chronological Table of the Statutes 1235–1991, HMSO, 1993.

Citations 

1420s in law
1424 in Scotland
15th century in sports
Acts of the Parliament of Scotland
Sports law
Association football law
Traditional football
Repealed Scottish legislation
Medieval Scots law
Scottish society in the Middle Ages
History of football in Scotland